Home for Christmas is a 1975 Finnish drama film directed by Jaakko Pakkasvirta. It was entered into the 9th Moscow International Film Festival.

Cast
 Paavo Pentikäinen as Urho Suomalainen
 Irma Martinkauppi as Sirkka Suomalainen
 Kaisa Martinkauppi as Leena Suomalainen
 Jari Erkkilä as Jari Suomalainen
 Selma Miettinen as Urho's mother
 Aapo Vilhunen as Sister's husband
 Tuija Ahvonen as Sirkka's sister
 Timo Martinkauppi as Alaja

See also
 List of Christmas films

References

External links
 

1975 films
1970s Christmas drama films
1970s Christmas films
1970s Finnish-language films
Finnish black-and-white films
Finnish Christmas drama films
1975 drama films